Pseudochalcia is a genus of moths of the family Noctuidae.

Species
 Pseudochalcia aranka Hacker & Ronkay, 1992
 Pseudochalcia inconspicua Graeser, 1888
 Pseudochalcia shugnana Sheljuzhko, 1929

References
 Natural History Museum Lepidoptera genus database
 Pseudochalcia at funet.fi

Plusiinae